Flor de María Pedraza Aguilera (born 21 August 1977) was a Mexican politician affiliated with the ultra right wing political party PAN. During 2013 she served as Deputy of the LXII Legislature of the Mexican Congress representing the Federal District.

References

1977 births
Living people
People from Mexico City
Women members of the Chamber of Deputies (Mexico)
National Action Party (Mexico) politicians
21st-century Mexican politicians
21st-century Mexican women politicians
Deputies of the LXII Legislature of Mexico
Members of the Chamber of Deputies (Mexico) for Mexico City